Ōgane Masujirō (October 28, 1894 – March 11, 1979) was a Japanese Home Ministry government official. He was born in Tochigi Prefecture. He graduated from the University of Tokyo. He was Grand Chamberlain of Japan (1947–1948).

References

Bibliography
 戦前期官僚制研究会編 / 秦郁彦著『戦前期日本官僚制の制度・組織・人事』、東京大学出版会、1981年

1894 births
1979 deaths
Japanese Home Ministry government officials
Politicians from Tochigi Prefecture
University of Tokyo alumni